Aethalura is a genus of moths in the family Geometridae.

Species
 Aethalura ignobilis (Butler, 1878)
 Aethalura intertexta – four-barred grey (Walker, 1860)
 Aethalura nanaria (Staudinger, 1897)
 Aethalura punctulata – grey birch (Denis & Schiffermüller, 1775)

References
 Aethalura at Markku Savela's Lepidoptera and some other life forms

Boarmiini
Geometridae genera